Joseph A. Whitehorn (1879 – January 23, 1926) was an American lawyer and politician from New York.

Life
He was born in 1879 in Romania. After the death of his mother, when he was about ten years old he emigrated together with his three years older brother to the United States. They lived in New York City where Joseph became a paperboy, and some years later a clerk in a clothing factory. While working during the day, he attended the evening course at New York University School of Law, graduated in 1904, was admitted to the bar, and began the practice of law in Manhattan. The next year he moved to Brooklyn.

Whitehorn was a member of the Socialist Party of America. In November 1916, he was elected to the New York State Assembly (Kings Co., 21st D.), defeating the incumbent Democrat Isaac Mendelsohn. Whitehorn was a member of the 140th New York State Legislature in 1917. Mendelsohn contested Whitehorn's election, but the Assembly decided in favor of Whitehorn. In November 1917, after re-apportionment, he was re-elected to the Assembly in the 14th District of Kings County, and was a member of the 141st New York State Legislature in 1918. The Citizens Union called Whitehorn an "able and effective" legislator. In November 1918, he ran for Congress in the 3rd District, but was defeated by Republican John MacCrate who had also won the Democratic primary.

In November 1925, Whitehorn ran unsuccessfully for the New York Supreme Court (2nd D.), polling 17,568 votes.

He died on January 23, 1926.

References

1879 births
1926 deaths
Politicians from Brooklyn
Members of the New York State Assembly
Socialist Party of America politicians from New York (state)
Romanian emigrants to the United States
New York University School of Law alumni